The 1996 Ballon d'Or, given to the best football player in Europe as judged by a panel of sports journalists from UEFA member countries, was awarded to Matthias Sammer on 24 December 1996.

Rankings

Additionally, 18 players were nominated but received no votes: Oliver Bierhoff, Laurent Blanc, Zvonimir Boban, Enrico Chiesa, Edgar Davids, Robbie Fowler, Thomas Helmer, Bernard Lama, Jari Litmanen, Andreas Möller, Pavel Nedvěd, Jay-Jay Okocha, Raí, Dejan Savićević, Mehmet Scholl, Diego Simeone, Gianluca Vialli and Javier Zanetti.

Notes

References

External links
 France Football Official Ballon d'Or page

1996
1996–97 in European football